The 2013–14 Latvian Hockey League season was the 23rd season of the Latvian Hockey League, the top level of ice hockey in Latvia. Six teams participated in the league, and HS Prizma Riga won the championship and qualified for the 2014–15 IIHF Continental Cup.

Regular season

Playoffs

External links
 Latvian Ice Hockey Federation

Latvian Hockey League
Latvian Hockey League seasons
Latvian